Dimitrov may refer to:
Dimitrov (surname)
Dimitrov, Armenia, a town in Armenia
Dimitrov, Russia, a rural locality (a settlement) in Tambov Oblast, Russia